Elections to Portsmouth City Council took place on Thursday 5 May 2022, alongside other local elections across the country. The seats contested in this election were last contested in 2018. The Conservative Party had 6 seats they were defending, while the Liberal Democrats and Labour were both defending 4 seats. No party gained a majority from this election, and therefore the council remains under no overall control, with the Liberal Democrats continuing to run the council in a minority.

Election results 

Immediately ahead of this election, the composition of the council was:

After the election result, the composition of the council became:

Results summary

Ward results
Comparisons for the purpose of determining a gain, hold or loss of a seat, and for all percentage changes, is to the last time these specific seats were up for election in 2018. An asterisk indicates the incumbent councillor.

Baffins

Central Southsea

Charles Dickens

Copnor

Cosham

Drayton & Farlington

Eastney & Craneswater

Fratton

Hilsea

Milton

Nelson

Paulsgrove

St. Jude

St. Thomas

References

Portsmouth
2022
2020s in Hampshire
May 2022 events in the United Kingdom